Rebecca Talbot Perkins (February 14, 1866 – November 1, 1956) was an American businessperson, philanthropist, and activist from Brooklyn, New York.  She was the founder of Talbot Perkins Children's Services. She was inducted into the National Women's Hall of Fame in 2009.

Early years 
Perkins was born Rebecca Clarendon Talbot in Brooklyn, the daughter of Joseph Talbot and the former Eliza Clarendon.

Career and education 
She attended what is now known as the Chautauqua Institution and continued to work there for ten years after graduating.

Joseph Talbot founded a real estate brokerage but died of influenza just a few years later, in 1890.  Rebecca, still unmarried, took over the business at a time when it was rare for a woman to be in business at all, let alone running a firm.

Even while running the brokerage, she maintained an active involvement in charity and social activism.  At various times, she led, among other organizations, the Alliance of Women's Clubs of Brooklyn, the People's Political League of Kings County, the Memorial Hospital for Women and Children, and the Welcome Home for Girls.  In 1927, she founded (with the Alliance) The Rebecca Talbot Perkins Adoption Society, which later became Talbot Perkins Children's Services.

Personal life 
She married Agar Ludlow Perkins on September 5, 1895.

References

1866 births
1956 deaths
American real estate businesspeople
19th-century American businesspeople
Philanthropists from New York (state)
American social activists
Place of death missing
People from Brooklyn
Activists from New York (state)
19th-century American businesswomen